The 2019 World Beach Games, officially known as the ANOC World Beach Games Qatar 2019 and commonly known as Qatar 2019, was the inaugural edition of the international beach and water multi-sport event organized by the Association of National Olympic Committees (ANOC). It was held for five days from 11 to 16 October 2019, in Doha, Qatar, with 110 medals contested across 14 disciplines.

It had originally been scheduled to be hosted in San Diego, United States in 2017. However, after first being postponed to 2019, the Games were then relocated as the city had not generated sufficient private funds needed to stage the event. In June 2019, Doha was announced as the last-minute replacement host city.

Spain were the best performing nation, claiming seven gold medals ahead of Brazil's five; hosts Qatar finished with one medal (silver). ANOC declared the event a success; a survey of the participating NOCs rated the Games an average of 8.65 out of 10.

Host selection
The application process to host the Games was opened in July 2015 with a deadline of the end of the month for submissions. Five cities ultimately put bids forward: two cities in the United States (San Diego, California and Sarasota, Florida) as well as Sochi, Russia, Dubai, United Arab Emirates, and an undisclosed Chinese city. Barcelona, Spain and Istanbul, Turkey had also previously expressed interest. San Diego emerged as the preferred bidder and was subject to a vote by the ANOC General Assembly at a meeting in Washington D.C. on 30 October 2015; the result was the unanimous approval of the city to be hosts of the inaugural Games.

The Games were originally scheduled to be held from 29 September to 9 October 2017. However, on 5 August 2016, the event was announced as postponed until 2019 to allow for more preparation time. Then, on 30 May 2019, ANOC stripped San Diego of its hosting rights, after the local organisers failed to generate enough private funding (reportedly $40 million) to hold the Games in the city.

ANOC immediately began negotiations to find replacement hosts. Just two weeks later, on 14 June 2019, Doha, Qatar was announced as the new host city, after ANOC was assured of funding from the country's government. This left just four months for Doha to prepare to stage the Games before the scheduled October start date but successfully delivered the event on time.

Development and preparation

Venues
Katara Beach (3x3 basketball, kitefoil racing, open water swimming, aquathlon, individual kata, beach wrestling, beach tennis, beach soccer)
Al Gharrafa (beach handball, beach volleyball)
Aspire Zone (bouldering, skateboarding)
Legtafiya Lagoon (waterski jump, wakeboard)

The Games

Sports
The 2019 ANOC World Beach Games featured 14 disciplines in 13 sports. All of the events in this edition were non-Olympic events, i.e., different from events in previous Summer Olympic programs, and were gender equal.

 Basketball
 
 Football
 
 Handball
 
 Karate
 
 Sailing
 
 Skateboarding
 
 Sport climbing
 
 Swimming
 
 Tennis
 
 Triathlon
 
 Volleyball
 
 Waterskiing
 
 
 Wrestling
 

Numbers in parentheses indicate the number of medal events contested in each separate discipline.

Scrapped sports
BMX freestyle and surfing had also been on the original programme but were removed. The former was confirmed as scrapped in January 2019 as a cost-cutting measure when the Games were still due to be held in San Diego. The latter was unable to be held in Doha due to a lack of suitable waves; ANOC still planned to have the surfing take place at a later date, under the Games' branding, and likely to be in the original venue of San Diego. However, in February 2020, the International Surfing Association (ISA) and ANOC agreed to cancel the planned event due to a busy calendar.

Participating National Olympic Committees (NOCs)
Of the world's 206 NOCs, 97 competed:

Calendar
All dates are AST (UTC+3)

Medal table

In February 2021, two medal winning athletes (one from Iran and one from Nigeria) were found guilty of doping offences committed at the Games. They were stripped of their medals which were subsequently reallocated.

See also
2019 African Beach Games
2019 Mediterranean Beach Games
2019 South American Beach Games

References

External links
Results book

 
World Beach Games
International sports competitions hosted by Qatar
Multi-sport events in Qatar
World Beach Games
2019
Sports competitions in Doha
World Beach Games
21st century in Doha